10th Planet Jiu-Jitsu is a non-traditional system of Brazilian Jiu-Jitsu developed by Eddie Bravo. It was one of the first Jiu-Jitsu school systems to avoid using a gi.

History
In 2003, after earning a black belt under Jean-Jacques Machado, Eddie Bravo opened his first 10th Planet Jiu-Jitsu school in Los Angeles, California. Bravo's system emphasizes developing students for submission-only grappling competition rather than points, he focused his jiu-jitsu training without the traditional gi, becoming one of the first jiu-jitsu schools to do so. The idea behind this was to try to implement as many of the techniques as possible in mixed martial arts (MMA) competitions. Bravo worked for the Ultimate Fighting Championship (UFC) during this time and felt high-level jiu-jitsu practitioners weren't winning as much as they should have, mainly attributing this to them wearing a gi when training jiu-jitsu, but competing in MMA without one.

10th Planet Jiu-Jitsu has been controversial since its inception; abandoning the gi drew some backlash from other Jiu-Jitsu schools and there has been a debate as to how many 10th Planet techniques, most notably its iterations of the rubber guard, translate to MMA.

In addition to the original 10th Planet headquarters in Los Angeles, there are over 100 schools worldwide. Some are established BJJ training facilities that have adopted the system as an expansion of the art. The style has spread overseas to Ireland, the United Kingdom, Germany, Sweden, Australia, Mexico, and Korea.

Notable Students

 Joe Rogan
 Ben Eddy
 Nathan Orchard

 Ben Saunders
 Tony Ferguson
 Keith Krikorian

 Carlos Condit
 Grace Gundrum
 Elvira Karppinen

 PJ Barch
 Andy Varela
 Geo Martinez

 Richie Martinez
 Vinny Magalhães
 Ryan Aitken

Publications
Victory Belt Publishing released three manuals covering techniques of the 10th Planet system: Mastering the Rubber Guard, Mastering the Twister, and Advanced Rubber Guard. The first and third books cover the system's signature rubber guard, while the second tackles the twister, another integral position in the system. The books were written by Eddie Bravo, Glen Cordoza, and Erich Krauss.
Eddie Bravo also airs an hour to two-hour online series every month on his website.

Ranking system
While 10th Planet Jiu-Jitsu uses the standard Brazilian Jiu-Jitsu ranking system, its practitioners most commonly train without gi and the belt. 10th Planet offers colored ranked rashguards to help visually denote belt rank.

References

External links 

10th Planet Jiu-Jitsu Official Site

Brazilian jiu-jitsu organizations